The Eduard Rhein Foundation was founded in 1976 in Hamburg (Germany) by Eduard Rhein. The goal of the foundation is to promote scientific research, learning, arts, and culture. This is done in particular by granting awards for outstanding achievements in research and/or development in the areas of radio, television and information technology.

Awards and honors
The foundation grants the following awards and honors:
 Technology Award (30,000 euro) 
 Cultural Award (10,000 euro) 
 Ring of Honor (moonstone set in gold) for outstanding work which has been accomplished over a long period of time, the number of living bearers of rings is limited to ten

Ring of Honor Recipients
1980 	Vladimir K. Zworykin
1981 	Walter Bruch
1982 	Max Grundig 
1983 	Karl Holzamer 
1984 	Herbert von Karajan
1985 	Hugh Greene
1986 	Masaru Ibuka 
1987 	Werner Höfer 
1988 	Ray Dolby  
1992 	Rudolf Hell 
1994 	Count Lennart Bernadotte of Wisborg
1998 	Heinz Zemanek 
1999   Vladimir A. Kotelnikov
2000 	Heinrich von Pierer 
2001 	Ernst-Ludwig Winnacker 	
2002 	Hans-Jürgen Warnecke 
2004 	Hubert S. Markl 
2007 	Valentina Tereshkova 	
2008 	Herbert Mataré 
2012 	Michael Sohlman 
2015   Wolfgang Heckl
2020   Gerd Hirzinger

Award winners
1979 to 2006 award winners are listed in the German article.

2007:
Technology Award: Prof. Dr. Dr. Gerhard Sessler for the design of electret transducers, the invention of the foil electret microphone (together with James West) and of the silicon condenser microphone (with D. Hohm).
 Cultural Award: Prof. Dr. Paul Dobrinski for the publication of scientific and technical works of young scientists.
 Ring of Honor: Dr. Dr. Valentina Tereshkova for her contributions in the area of manned space flight.

2008
 Technology Award: Siegfried Dais and Uwe Kiencke for invention, international standardisation and propagation of the "Controller Area Network" (CAN), an open, reliable real-time communication system for embedded devices in automotive, medical and automation applications as well as in consumer goods, which today dominates the world market.
 Cultural Award: Norbert Lossau for brilliantly written science and technology related articles published in the newspaper "Die Welt". Over a sustained period of time his outstanding contributions are received by the readers as splendidly written, comprehensive in scope yet to read sources of information.
 Ring of Honor: Herbert F. Mataré for his invention of the solid state amplifier in 1948, performed independently and parallel to Bell Lab's transistor. Further, in recognition of his important contributions to information technology, solid-state physics and -manufacturing over a period of more than 60 years.

2009 
 Technology Award: Dr. Martin Schadt Electro-optical core technologies for flat panel displays

2010 
 Technology Award: Prof. Dr. Jens-Rainer Ohm and Prof. Dr. Thomas Wiegand Contributions to video coding and to the development of the H.264/AVC standard

2011 
 Technology Award: Prof. Dr. Wolfgang Hilberg 	Invention of the radio clock

2012 
 Technology Award: Prof. Dr. Bradford Parkinson Development of the Global Positioning System (GPS)
 Technology Award: Dov Moran for inventing the USB flash drive.

2013 
 Technology Award: Ching W. Tang for inventing the first highly efficient organic light emitting diode and further contributions to the development of organic semiconductor devices.

2014 
 Technology Award: Prof. Dr. Dr. Kees Schouhamer Immink for contributions to the theory and practice of channel codes that enable efficient and reliable optical recording, and creative contributions to digital recording technology.

2015 
 Technology Award: Prof. Dr.-Ing. Dr. rer. nat. h.c. mult. Karlheinz Brandenburg, Dr.-Ing. Bernhard Grill and Prof. Dr.-Ing. Jürgen Herre for decisive contributions to the development and practical implementation of the mp3 audio coding technique.

2016 
 Technology Award: Prof. Blake S. Wilson,  Prof. Dipl-.Ing. Dr.tech. Erwin Hochmair and Dipl.-Ing. Dr. techn. Dr. med. Ingeborg J. Hochmair-Desoyer for the development and commercialization of the world’s first multi-channel microelectronic cochlear implant.

2017 
 Technology Award: Prof. Dr.-Ing. Ernst D. Dickmanns for pioneering contributions to autonomic driving.

2018 
 Technology Award: Dr. Rajiv Laroia for pioneering work on Flash OFDM as a Forerunner of Fourth-Generation Mobile Communications (4G).

2019 
 Technology Award: Dr. Franz Laermer and Andrea Urban for the invention of the deep reactive ion etching process (Bosch Process), a key process for manufacturing semiconductor sensors.

2020 
 Technology Award: Prof. Neal Koblitz, Ph.D. and Victor S. Miller, Ph.D. for the invention of cryptography based on elliptic curves.

2021 
 Technology Award: Prof. Denis Le Bihan, MD, Ph.D. and Peter J. Basser, Ph.D. for the development of MRI diffusion tensor imaging, which is used for surgery and radiation planning, for research into neurological diseases associated with white matter changes, and for reconstruction of neural pathways in the brain (tractography).

References

External links
http://www.eduard-rhein-foundation.de/

Foundations based in Germany
Science and technology awards
1976 establishments in West Germany